This is a discography of Tosca, an opera by Giacomo Puccini. It premiered at the Teatro Costanzi in Rome on 14 January 1900. Tosca has been one of the most frequently recorded operas, dating back to a nearly complete acoustical recording in 1918.

Audio

Video

References
Notes

Sources
Blyth, Alan, ed. Opera on Record. Hutchinson & Co., London. 1979.
Gruber, Paul, ed. The Metropolitan Opera Guide to Recorded Opera. W. W. Norton & Co., New York. 1993.

External links

Opera discographies
Operas by Giacomo Puccini